Muri District is a district in the Swiss Canton of Aargau with the administrative capital of Muri.

Geography
Of this area,  or 68.8% is used for agricultural purposes, while  or 19.3% is forested. Of the rest of the land,  or 9.8% is settled (buildings or roads).

Coat of arms

The blazon of the district coat of arms is Gules a Wall in fess embattled Argent masoned Sable..

Demographics
, 13.2% of the population are foreign nationals.

Economy
 there were 15,053 workers who lived in the district.  Of these, 10,391 or about 69.0% of the residents worked outside the Muri district while 4,675 people commuted into the district for work.  There were a total of 9,337 jobs (of at least 6 hours per week) in the district.

Religion
Of the rest of the population, there were 18 individuals (or about 0.06% of the population) who belonged to the Christian Catholic faith.

Education
Of the school age population, there are 2,724 students attending primary school, there are 935 students attending secondary school, there are 569 students attending tertiary or university level schooling, and there are 14 students who are seeking a job after school in the municipality.

Municipalities

Mergers
The following changes to the district's municipalities have occurred since 2000:

On 1 January 2012 the municipality of Benzenschwil merged into Merenschwand.

References

Districts of Aargau